Ashpitel is an English surname. Notable people with the surname include:

 Arthur Ashpitel (1807–1869), English architect
 William Hurst Ashpitel (1776–1852), English architect

English-language surnames